Melody Garden is an MTR Light Rail stop. It is located at ground level at Wu Chui Road between Melody Garden and Butterfly Estate in Tuen Mun District. It began service on 18 September 1988 and belongs to Zone 1.

MTR Light Rail stops
Former Kowloon–Canton Railway stations
Tuen Mun District
Railway stations in Hong Kong opened in 1988
MTR Light Rail stops named from housing estates